Stanley John Haynes was an Anglican bishop in the early part of the 20th century in South Africa.

Haynes was the assistant bishop in the Diocese of Bloemfontein in the 1920s. He was consecrated on 2 October 1923.

He married Cecil Maude Agnes Currey on 12 January 1926 in Rondebosch, Cape Town. The marriage service was conducted by William Carter, archbishop of Cape Town.

References

External links

Date of birth unknown
Date of death unknown
20th-century Anglican Church of Southern Africa bishops
Anglican bishops of Bloemfontein